Arthrobacter tecti is a Gram-positive, non-spore-forming and non-motile bacterium species from the genus Arthrobacter which has been isolated from a biofilm which covered the Servilia tomb from the Roman necropolis of Carmona in Carmona, Spain.

References

Further reading

External links
Type strain of Arthrobacter tecti at BacDive -  the Bacterial Diversity Metadatabase

Bacteria described in 2005
Micrococcaceae